The 1931 Perserikatan season was the second season of the Indonesian Perserikatan football competition since its establishment in 1930. Voetbalbond Indies Jakarta (V.I.J.) is the defending champions won his first league title.

It was contested by 3 teams and the first season competition was organised under the Persatuan Sepakbola Seluruh Indonesia (PSSI). V.I.J. won the championship.

Final tournament

Results
All of the matches were held at the southern field of Keraton Surakarta Hadiningrat.

Final table
<onlyinclude>

References

External links
P.S.S.I. (inlandsche) Stedenwedstrĳden 1930-1950

1931 in Asian football
1931 in association football
1931 in the Dutch East Indies
Seasons in Indonesian football competitions
Sport in the Dutch East Indies
1931 in Dutch sport